Moving Art Magazine was founded in 2007 in the Netherlands. Moving Art magazine started out as an art magazine, which mainly focused on Dutch and Belgian contemporary art, artists, galleries, auctions, exhibitions and events. In 2010, the magazine would be published in English.

External links
 Official Site 

2007 establishments in the Netherlands
Contemporary art magazines
Magazines published in the Netherlands
Dutch-language magazines
English-language magazines
Magazines established in 2007
Triannual magazines